13th FAI World Rally Flying Championship took place between July 26 – August 3, 2003 in Rustenburg in South Africa.

There were 51 crews from 14 countries: South Africa (7), Poland (4), France (4), Czech Republic (4), Austria (6), United Kingdom (6), Germany (6), Russia (3), Spain (3), Chile (3), Greece (2), Hungary (1), Cyprus (1), Portugal (1).

Contest
First navigation competition:
 Nigel Hopkins / Dale de Klerk  - 324 penal points
 Philippe Odeon / Philippe Muller  - 344 pts
 Krzysztof Wieczorek / Wacław Wieczorek  - 418 pts

Second navigation competition:
 Nigel Hopkins / Dale de Klerk  - 166 pts
 Nathalie Strube / Patrick Sicard   - 538 pts
 M. Lifshits / Dmitri Sukharev   - 576 pts

Third navigation competition:
 Jiří Filip / Michal Filip  - 168 pts
 Janusz Darocha / Zbigniew Chrząszcz  - 188 pts
 Adrian Pilling / Renier Moolman  - 188 pts

Results

Individual 

Pilot / navigator; country; penal points for observation + navigation + landings

Team
Counted two best crews (number of penal points):
 - 2594
 - 3104
 - 3216
 - 3432
 - 5466
 - 5954
 - 6244
 - 6706
 - 8791
 - 11097
 - 20414

Trivia
It was the first FAI World Rally Flying Championship since the 5th FAI World Rally Flying Championship in 1986, not won by the Poles.

External links
Official page
13th FAI World Rally Flying Championship

Rally Flying 13
International sports competitions hosted by South Africa
Rally
Fédération Aéronautique Internationale
Aviation history of South Africa